The Best of BBC Radio 1's Live Lounge is a collection of live tracks played on Jo Whiley's and Fearne Cotton's Radio 1 shows. It consists of both covers and the bands' own songs. It consisted of tracks previously available on past Live Lounge compilation albums, as well as one that was previously unavailable.

The second disc is over 80 minutes long making it exceed the length of almost all compact discs.

The booklet gives a history on the series.

Track listing

References

Live Lounge
2011 compilation albums
Covers albums
2011 live albums

simple:Radio 1's Live Lounge